Hanne Maren Blåfjelldal (born 27 May 1981) is a Norwegian politician for the Progress Party. She has been state secretatary for Sylvi Listhaug in the Ministry of Agriculture and Food since October 2013.

Blåfjelldal hails from Sør-Aurdal in Valdres. She was a member of the county council of Oppland 2003–2007 and 2011–2012 and a member of the municipal council of Sør-Aurdal 2007–2010.

She worked as a political consultant on educational and church affairs for the Progress Party's parliamentary group 2003–2007. She served as deputy leader of the Progress Party's Youth 2008–2010 and was a member of the Executive Board of the Progress Party 2011–2013. She was first deputy member to the Parliament of Norway for the Progress Party from Oppland 2009–2013.

In 2007, she obtained a Master's degree in Human geography at the University of Oslo. She undertook one year of study in pedagogy (Norw: Praktisk-pedagogisk utdanning) in 2010. She was manager for an educational project in Vågå municipality 2010–2012 and worked as a teacher in Høyanger 2012–2013.

References

External links 
Statssekretær Hanne Maren Blåfjelldal at the Ministry of Agriculture and Food.
Personal blog 

Progress Party (Norway) politicians
Norwegian state secretaries
University of Oslo alumni
People from Sør-Aurdal
1981 births
Living people